Tsvetan Yonchev (born 15 February 1956) is a former Bulgarian footballer who played as a winger, and a current manager of Minyor Chicago in the United States.

Career
Yonchev was born in Vratsa. A youth product of hometown club Botev Vratsa, he spent two seasons with the first team, before switching to CSKA Sofia in 1975. He played 234 matches for the club in the A Group, scoring 54 goals.

Yonchev was a key part of the CSKA's team that reached 1980–81 European Cup quarterfinals and 1981–82 European Cup semifinals. On 17 September 1980, he scored in his side's 1–0 home win against holders Nottingham Forest; he also started in the second leg, a 1–0 win at City Ground. In the second round, Yonchev scored a hat-trick for a 4–0 home win over Szombierki Bytom. On 4 March 1981, he netted CSKA's only goal in a 5–1 loss against Liverpool at Anfield, in their quarter-final first leg tie.

With CSKA Yonchev won five A Group titles and one Bulgarian Cup. On 3 April 1983, he scored two goals as CSKA beat Spartak Varna 4–0 in the 1983 Bulgarian Cup Final.

After nine seasons at CSKA, Yonchev joined Slavia Sofia in 1984.

Honours

Player
CSKA Sofia
 A Group (5): 1975–76, 1979–80, 1980–81, 1981–82, 1982–83
 Bulgarian Cup: 1983

Coach
CSKA Sofia
 Bulgarian Cup: 1993

References

External links

1956 births
Living people
Bulgarian footballers
Bulgaria international footballers
Association football midfielders
First Professional Football League (Bulgaria) players
FC Botev Vratsa players
PFC CSKA Sofia players
PFC Slavia Sofia players
PFC Ludogorets Razgrad players
F.C. Felgueiras players
Bulgarian expatriate footballers
Expatriate footballers in Portugal
Bulgarian expatriate sportspeople in Portugal
Bulgarian football managers
PFC CSKA Sofia managers
Bulgarian emigrants to the United States
People from Vratsa